Jessica Coon is a professor of linguistics at McGill University and Canada Research Chair in syntax and indigenous languages. She was the linguistics expert consultant for the 2016 film Arrival.

Coon works on ergativity, split ergativity, case and agreement, nominalization, field methodology, and collaborative language work in Ch'ol and Chuj (Mayan) and Mi'gmaq (Algonquian).

Early life and education
Coon received her PhD from MIT in 2010 with a dissertation on aspect-based split ergativity, with a focus on the Ch'ol (Mayan) language, and cross-linguistic extensions.

Coon received her BA in linguistics-anthropology from Reed College in May 2004.

Career
Coon teaches linguistics to both graduate and undergraduate students at McGill University.

In 2011, she began collaborating with language teachers in the Mi’gmaq Listuguj community, in order to document, research, and develop teaching materials for Mi’gmaq, a First Nations language of Quebec.

Coon was consulted during the finalization of the script for Denis Villeneuve's Arrival for her linguistics expertise. She wrote a piece for the Museum of the Moving Image on fieldwork and alien grammars, following her work on Arrival.

Since 2018, Coon has led a National Geographic project "to record, transcribe, and translate narratives across different dialects of Ch'ol."

Key publications 
Coon, Jessica and Lauren Clemens (2018). 'Deriving verb-initial word order in Mayan.' Language, 94,2: 237–280. 
Coon, Jessica (2017). Ch’ol. The Mayan Languages, eds. Judith Aissen, Nora England, and Roberto Zavala. London: Routledge.
Coon, Jessica, Pedro Mateo Pedro, and Omer Preminger (2014). 'The role of case in A-bar extraction asymmetries: Evidence from Mayan.' Linguistic Variarion, 14,2: 179–242.
Coon, Jessica (2013). Aspects of Split Ergativity. New York: Oxford University Press.

References

External links 
 Academic homepage
 

Linguists from the United States
Linguists from Canada
Syntacticians
Women linguists
Living people
Year of birth missing (living people)
21st-century linguists
Linguists of Algic languages
Linguists of Mesoamerican languages
Massachusetts Institute of Technology alumni
Reed College alumni
Academic staff of McGill University
21st-century Mesoamericanists